Big Prairie Dog Creek is a stream in the U.S. state of South Dakota.

Big Prairie Dog Creek was named after the prairie dog native to the area.

See also
List of rivers of South Dakota

References

Rivers of Haakon County, South Dakota
Rivers of Jones County, South Dakota
Rivers of Stanley County, South Dakota
Rivers of South Dakota